League of Legends (LoL), commonly referred to as League, is a 2009 multiplayer online battle arena video game developed and published by Riot Games. Inspired by Defense of the Ancients, a custom map for Warcraft III, Riot's founders sought to develop a stand-alone game in the same genre. Since its release in October 2009, League has been free-to-play and is monetized through purchasable character customization. The game is available for Microsoft Windows and macOS.

In the game, two teams of five players battle in player-versus-player combat, each team occupying and defending their half of the map. Each of the ten players controls a character, known as a "champion", with unique abilities and differing styles of play. During a match, champions become more powerful by collecting experience points, earning gold, and purchasing items to defeat the opposing team. In Leagues main mode, Summoner's Rift, a team wins by pushing through to the enemy base and destroying their "Nexus", a large structure located within.

League of Legends has received generally positive reviews; critics highlighted its accessibility, character designs, and production value. The game's long lifespan has resulted in a critical reappraisal, with reviews trending positively; the negative and abusive in-game behavior of its players, criticized since early in the game's lifetime, persists despite Riot's attempts to fix the problem. In 2019, League regularly peaked at eight million concurrent players, and its popularity has led to tie-ins such as music videos, comic books, short stories, and the animated series Arcane. Its success has also spawned several spin-off video games, including a mobile version, a digital collectible card game and a turn-based role-playing game, among others. A massively multiplayer online role-playing game based on the property is in development.

Regularly cited as the world's largest esport, the game has an international competitive scene consisting of multiple regional leagues. They culminate in the annual League of Legends World Championship. The 2019 event registered over 100 million unique viewers, peaking at a concurrent viewership of 44 million during the finals. Domestic and international events have been broadcast on livestreaming websites such as Twitch, YouTube, Bilibili, and on cable television sports channel ESPN.

Gameplay

League of Legends is a multiplayer online battle arena (MOBA) game in which the player controls a character ("champion") with a set of unique abilities from an isometric perspective. As of 2023, there are over 160 champions available to play. Over the course of a match, champions gain levels by accruing experience points (XP) through killing enemies. Items can be acquired to increase champions' strength, and are bought with gold, which players accrue passively over time and earn actively by defeating the opposing team's minions, champions, or defensive structures. In the main game mode, Summoner's Rift, items are purchased through a shop menu available to players only when their champion is in the team's base. Each match is discrete; levels and items do not transfer from one match to another.

Summoner's Rift

Summoner's Rift is the flagship game mode of League of Legends and the most prominent in professional-level play. The mode has a ranked competitive ladder; a matchmaking system determines a player's skill level and generates a starting rank from which they can climb. There are nine tiers; the least skilled are Iron, Bronze, and Silver, and the highest are Master, Grandmaster, and Challenger.

Two teams of five players compete to destroy the opposing team's "Nexus", which is guarded by the enemy champions and defensive structures known as "turrets". Each team's Nexus is located in their base, where players start the game and reappear after death. Non-player characters known as minions are generated from each team's Nexus and advance towards the enemy base along three lanes guarded by turrets: top, middle, and bottom. Each team's base contains three "inhibitors", one behind the third tower from the center of each lane. Destroying one of the enemy team's inhibitors causes stronger allied minions to spawn in that lane, and allows the attacking team to damage the enemy Nexus and the two turrets guarding it. The regions in between the lanes are collectively known as the "jungle", which is inhabited by "monsters" that, like minions, respawn at regular intervals. Like minions, monsters provide gold and XP when killed. Another, more powerful class of monster resides within the river that separates each team's jungle. These monsters require multiple players to defeat and grant special abilities to their slayers' team. For example, teams can gain a powerful allied unit after killing the Rift Herald, permanent strength boosts by killing dragons, and stronger, more durable minions by killing Baron Nashor.

Summoner's Rift matches can last from as little as 15 minutes to over an hour. Although the game does not enforce where players may go, conventions have arisen over the game's lifetime: typically one player goes in the top lane, one in the middle lane, one in the jungle, and two in the bottom lane. Players in a lane kill minions to accumulate gold and XP (termed "farming") and try to prevent their opponent from doing the same. A fifth champion, known as a "jungler", farms the jungle monsters and, when powerful enough, assists their teammates in a lane.

Other modes 

Besides Summoner's Rift, League of Legends has two other permanent game modes. ARAM ("All Random, All Mid") is a five-versus-five mode like Summoner's Rift, but on a map called Howling Abyss with only one long lane, no jungle area, and with champions randomly chosen for players. Given the small size of the map, players must be vigilant in avoiding enemy abilities.

Teamfight Tactics is an auto battler released in June 2019 and made a permanent game mode the following month. As with others in its genre, players build a team and battle to be the last one standing. Players do not directly affect combat but position their units on a board for them to fight automatically against opponents each round. Teamfight Tactics is available for iOS and Android and has cross-platform play with the Windows and macOS clients.

Other game modes have been made available temporarily, typically aligning with in-game events. Ultra Rapid Fire (URF) mode was available for two weeks as a 2014 April Fools Day prank. In the mode, champion abilities have no resource cost, significantly reduced cooldown timers, increased movement speed, reduced healing, and faster attacks. A year later, in April 2015, Riot disclosed that they had not brought the mode back because its unbalanced design resulted in player "burnout". The developer also said the costs associated with maintaining and balancing URF were too high. Other temporary modes include One for All and Nexus Blitz. One for All has players pick a champion for all members of their team to play. In Nexus Blitz, players participate in a series of mini-games on a compressed map.

Development

Pre-release 

Riot Games' founders Brandon Beck and Marc Merill had an idea for a spiritual successor to Defense of the Ancients, known as DotA. A mod for Warcraft III: Reign of Chaos, DotA required players to buy Warcraft III and install custom software; The Washington Post Brian Crecente said the mod "lacked a level of polish and was often hard to find and set up". Phillip Kollar of Polygon noted that Blizzard Entertainment supported Warcraft III with an expansion pack, then shifted their focus to other projects while the game still had players. Beck and Merill sought to create a game that would be supported over a significantly longer period.

Beck and Merill held a DotA tournament for students at the University of Southern California, with an ulterior goal of recruitment. There they met Jeff Jew, later a producer on League of Legends. Jew was very familiar with DotA and spent much of the tournament teaching others how to play. Beck and Merill invited him to an interview, and he joined Riot Games as an intern. Beck and Merill recruited two figures involved with DotA: Steve Feak, one of its designers, and Steve Mescon, who ran a support website to assist players. Feak said early development was highly iterative, comparing it to designing DotA.

A demonstration of League of Legends built in the Warcraft III game engine was completed in four months and then shown at the 2007 Game Developers Conference. There, Beck and Merill had little success with potential investors. Publishers were confused by the game's free-to-play business model and lack of a single-player mode. The free-to-play model was untested outside of Asian markets, so publishers were primarily interested in a retail release, and the game's capacity for a sequel. In 2008, Riot reached an agreement with holding company Tencent to oversee the game's launch in China.

League of Legends was announced October 7, 2008, for Microsoft Windows. Closed beta-testing began in April 2009. Upon the launch of the beta, seventeen champions were available. Riot initially aimed to ship the game with 20 champions but doubled the number before the game's full release in North America on October 27, 2009. The game's full name was announced as League of Legends: Clash of Fates. Riot planned to use the subtitle to signal when future content was available, but decided they were silly and dropped it before launch.

Post-release 
League of Legends receives regular updates in the form of patches. Although previous games had utilized patches to ensure no one strategy dominated, League of Legends patches made keeping pace with the developer's changes a core part of the game. In 2014, Riot standardized their patch cadence to once approximately every two or three weeks.

The development team includes hundreds of game designers and artists. In 2016, the music team had four full-time composers and a team of producers creating audio for the game and its promotional materials. , the game has over 150 champions, and Riot Games periodically overhauls the visuals and gameplay of the oldest in the roster. Although only available for Microsoft Windows at launch, a Mac version of the game was made available in March 2013.

Revenue model
League of Legends uses a free-to-play business model. Several forms of purely cosmetic customization—for example, "skins" that change the appearance of champions—can be acquired after buying an in-game currency called Riot Points (RP). Skins have five main pricing tiers, ranging from $4 to $25. As virtual goods, they have high profit margins. A loot box system has existed in the game since 2016; these are purchasable virtual "chests" with randomized, cosmetic items. These chests can be bought outright or acquired at a slower rate for free by playing the game. The practice has been criticized as a form of gambling. In 2019, Riot Games' CEO said that he hoped loot boxes would become less prevalent in the industry. Riot has also experimented with other forms of monetization. In August 2019, they announced an achievement system purchasable with Riot Points. The system was widely criticized for its high cost and low value.

In 2014, Ubisoft analyst Teut Weidemann said that only around 4% of players paid for cosmetics—significantly lower than the industry standard of 15 to 25%. He argued the game was only profitable because of its large player base. In 2017, the game had a revenue of US$2.1 billion; in 2018, a lower figure of  still positioned it as one of the highest-grossing games of 2018. In 2019, the number rose to $1.5 billion, and again to $1.75 billion in 2020. According to magazine Inc., players collectively played three billion hours every month in 2016.

Plot

Before 2014, players existed in-universe as political leaders, or "Summoners", commanding champions to fight on the Fields of Justice—for example, Summoner's Rift—to avert a catastrophic war. Sociologist Matt Watson said the plot and setting were bereft of the political themes found in other role-playing games, and presented in reductive "good versus evil" terms. In the game's early development, Riot did not hire writers, and designers wrote character biographies only a paragraph long.

In September 2014, Riot Games rebooted the game's fictional setting, removing summoners from the game's lore to avoid "creative stagnation". Luke Plunkett wrote for Kotaku that, although the change would upset long-term fans, it was necessary as the game's player base grew in size. Shortly after the reboot, Riot hired Warhammer writer Graham McNeill. Riot's storytellers and artists create flavor text, adding "richness" to the game, but very little of this is seen as a part of normal gameplay. Instead, that work supplies a foundation for the franchise's expansion into other media, such as comic books and spin-off video games. The Fields of Justice were replaced by a new fictional setting—a planet called Runeterra. The setting has elements from several genres—from Lovecraftian horror to traditional sword and sorcery fantasy.

Reception 

League of Legends received generally favorable reviews on its initial release, according to review aggregator website Metacritic. Many publications noted the game's high replay value. Kotaku reviewer Brian Crecente admired how items altered champion play styles. Quintin Smith of Eurogamer concurred, praising the amount of experimentation offered by champions. Comparing it to Defense of the Ancients, Rick McCormick of GamesRadar+ said that playing League of Legends was "a vote for choice over refinement".

Given the game's origins, other reviewers frequently compared aspects of it to DotA. According to GamesRadar+ and GameSpot, League of Legends would feel familiar to those who had already played DotA. The game's inventive character design and lively colors distinguished the game from its competitors. Smith concluded his review by noting that, although there was not "much room for negativity", Riot's goal of refining DotA had not yet been realized.

Although Crecente praised the game's free-to-play model, GameSpy Ryan Scott was critical of the grind required for non-paying players to unlock key gameplay elements, calling it unacceptable in a competitive game. Many outlets said the game was underdeveloped. A physical version of the game was available for purchase from retailers; GameSpot Kevin VanOrd said it was an inadvisable purchase because the value included $10 of store credit for an unavailable store. German site GameStar noted that none of the bonuses in that version were available until the launch period had ended and refused to carry out a full review. IGN Steve Butts compared the launch to the poor state of CrimeCraft release earlier in 2009; he indicated that features available during League of Legends beta were removed for the release, even for those who purchased the retail version. Matches took unnecessarily long to find for players, with long queue times, and GameRevolution mentioned frustrating bugs.

Some reviewers addressed toxicity in the game's early history. Crecente wrote that the community was "insular" and "whiney" when losing. Butts speculated that League of Legends inherited many of DotA players, who had developed a reputation for being "notoriously hostile" to newcomers.

Reassessment 

Regular updates to the game have resulted in a reappraisal by some outlets; IGN's second reviewer, Leah B. Jackson, explained that the website's original review had become "obsolete". Two publications increased their original scores: GameSpot from 6 to 9, and IGN from 8 to 9.2. The variety offered by the champion roster was described by Steven Strom of PC Gamer as "fascinating"; Jackson pointed to "memorable" characters and abilities. Although the items had originally been praised at release by other outlets such as Kotaku, Jackson's reassessment criticized the lack of item diversity and viability, noting that the items recommended to the player by the in-game shop were essentially required because of their strength.

While reviewers were pleased with the diverse array of play styles offered by champions and their abilities, Strom thought that the female characters still resembled those in "horny Clash of Clans clones" in 2018. Two years before Strom's review, a champion designer responded to criticism by players that a young, female champion was not conventionally attractive. He argued that limiting female champions to one body type was constraining, and said progress had been made in Riot's recent releases.

Comparisons persisted between the game and others in the genre. GameSpot Tyler Hicks wrote that new players would pick up League of Legends quicker than DotA and that the removal of randomness-based skills made the game more competitive. Jackson described League of Legends''' rate of unlock for champions as "a model of generosity", but less than DotA sequel, Dota 2 (2013), produced by Valve, wherein characters are unlocked by default. Strom said the game was fast-paced compared to Dota 2 "yawning" matches, but slower than those of Blizzard Entertainment's "intentionally accessible" MOBA Heroes of the Storm (2015).

Accolades
At the first Game Developers Choice Awards in 2010, the game won four major awards: Best Online Technology, Game Design, New Online Game, and Visual Arts. At the 2011 Golden Joystick Awards, it won Best Free-to-Play Game. Music produced for the game won a Shorty Award, and was nominated at the Hollywood Music in Media Awards.League of Legends has received awards for its contribution to esports. It was nominated for Best Esports Game at The Game Awards in 2017 and 2018, then won in 2019, 2020, and 2021. Specific events organized by Riot for esports tournaments have been recognized by awards ceremonies. Also at The Game Awards, the Riot won Best Esports Event for the 2019, 2020 and 2021 League World Championships. At the 39th Sports Emmy Awards in 2018, League of Legends won Outstanding Live Graphic Design for the 2017 world championship; as part of the pre-competition proceedings, Riot used augmented reality technology to have a computer-generated dragon fly across the stage.

 Player behavior League of Legends' player base has a longstanding reputation for "toxicity"—negative and abusive in-game behavior, with a survey by the Anti-Defamation League indicating that 76% of players have experienced in-game harassment. Riot Games has acknowledged the problem and responded that only a small portion of the game's players are consistently toxic. According to Jeffrey Lin, the lead designer of social systems at Riot Games, the majority of negative behavior is committed by players "occasionally acting out". Several major systems have been implemented to tackle the issue. One such measure is basic report functionality; players can report teammates or opponents who violate the game's code of ethics. The in-game chat is also monitored by algorithms that detect several types of abuse. An early system was the "Tribunal"—players who met certain requirements were able to review reports sent to Riot. If enough players determined that the messages were a violation, an automated system would punish them. Lin said that eliminating toxicity was an unrealistic goal, and the focus should be on rewarding good player behavior. To that effect, Riot reworked the "Honor system" in 2017, allowing players to award teammates with virtual medals following games, for one of three positive attributes. Acquiring these medals increases a player's "Honor level", rewarding them with free loot boxes over time.

In esportsLeague of Legends is one of the world's largest esports, described by The New York Times as its "main attraction". Online viewership and in-person attendance for the game's esports events outperformed those of the National Basketball Association, the World Series, and the Stanley Cup in 2016. For the 2019 and 2020 League of Legends World Championship finals, Riot Games reported 44 and 45 peak million concurrent viewers respectively. Harvard Business Review said that League of Legends epitomized the birth of the esports industry.

, Riot Games operates 12 regional leagues internationally, four of which—China, Europe, Korea, and North America—have franchised systems. In 2017, this system comprised 109 teams and 545 players. League games are typically livestreamed on platforms such as Twitch and YouTube. The company sells streaming rights to the game; the North American league playoff is broadcast on cable television by sports network ESPN. In China, the rights to stream international events such as the World Championships and the Mid-Season Invitational were sold to Bilibili in Fall 2020 for a three-year deal reportedly worth US$113 million, while exclusive streaming rights for the domestic and other regional leagues are owned by Huya Live. The game's highest-paid professional players have commanded salaries of above $1 million—over three times the highest-paid players of Overwatch. The scene has attracted investment from businesspeople otherwise unassociated with esports, such as retired basketball player Rick Fox, who founded his own team. In 2020, his team's slot in the North American league was sold to the Evil Geniuses organization for $33 million.

 Spin-offs and other media 

 Games 
For the 10th anniversary of League of Legends in 2019, Riot Games announced several games at various stages of production that were directly related to the League of Legends intellectual property (IP). A stand-alone version of Teamfight Tactics was announced for mobile operating systems iOS and Android at the event and released in March 2020. The game has cross-platform play with the Windows and macOS clients. Legends of Runeterra, a free-to-play digital collectible card game, launched in April 2020 for Microsoft Windows; the game features characters from League of Legends. League of Legends: Wild Rift is a version of the game for mobile operating systems Android, iOS, and unspecified consoles. Instead of porting the game from League of Legends, Wild Rift's character models and environments were entirely rebuilt. A single-player, turn-based role-playing game, Ruined King: A League of Legends Story, was released in 2021 for PlayStation 4, PlayStation 5, Xbox One, Xbox Series X/S, Nintendo Switch, and Windows. It was the first title released under Riot Games' publishing arm, Riot Forge, wherein non-Riot studios develop games using League of Legends characters. In December 2020, Greg Street, vice-president of IP and Entertainment at Riot Games, announced that a massively multiplayer online role-playing game based on the game is in development. Song of Nunu: A League of Legends Story, a third-person adventure game revolving around the champion Nunu's search for his mother, with the help of the yeti Willump, was announced for a planned release in 2022. It is being developed by Tequila Works, the creators of Rime.

 Music 

Riot Games' first venture into music was in 2014 with the virtual heavy metal band Pentakill, promoting a skin line of the same name. Pentakill is composed of seven champions, and their music was primarily made by Riot Games' in-house music team but featured cameos by Mötley Crüe drummer Tommy Lee and Danny Lohner, a former member of industrial rock band Nine Inch Nails. Their second album, Grasp of the Undying, reached Number 1 on the iTunes metal charts in 2017.

Pentakill was followed by K/DA, a virtual K-pop girl group composed of four champions. As with Pentakill, K/DA is promotional material for a skin line by the same name. The group's debut single, "Pop/Stars", which premiered at the 2018 League of Legends World Championship, garnered over 400 million views on YouTube and sparked widespread interest from people unfamiliar with League of Legends. After a two-year hiatus, in August 2020, Riot Games released "The Baddest", the pre-release single for All Out, the five-track debut EP from K/DA which followed in November that year.

In 2019, Riot created a virtual hip hop group called True Damage, featuring the champions Akali, Yasuo, Qiyana, Senna, and Ekko. The vocalists—Keke Palmer, Thutmose, Becky G, Duckwrth, and Soyeon—performed a live version of the group's debut song, "Giants", during the opening ceremony of the 2019 League of Legends World Championship, alongside holographic versions of their characters. The in-game cosmetics promoted by the music video featured a collaboration with fashion house Louis Vuitton.

 Comics 
Riot announced a collaboration with Marvel Comics in 2018. Riot had previously experimented with releasing comics through its website. Shannon Liao of The Verge noted that the comic books were "a rare opportunity for Riot to showcase its years of lore that has often appeared as an afterthought". The first comic was League of Legends: Ashe—Warmother, which debuted in 2018, followed by League of Legends: Lux that same year. A print version of the latter was released in 2019.

 Animated series 
In a video posted to celebrate the tenth anniversary of League of Legends, Riot announced an animated television series, Arcane, the company's first production for television. Arcane was a collaborative effort between Riot Games and animation studio Fortiche Production. In an interview with The Hollywood Reporter, head of creative development Greg Street said the series is "not a light-hearted show. There are some serious themes that we explore there, so we wouldn't want kids tuning in and expecting something that it's not." The series is set in the utopian city of Piltover and its underground, oppressed sister city, Zaun. The series was set to be released in 2020 but was delayed by the COVID-19 pandemic. On November 6, 2021, Arcane'' premiered on Netflix following the 2021 League of Legends World Championship, and was available through Tencent Video in China. The series received critical acclaim upon release, with IGN's Rafael Motomayor asking rhetorically if the series marked the end of the "video game adaptation curse". It stars Hailee Steinfeld as Vi, Ella Purnell as Jinx, Kevin Alejandro as Jayce, and Katie Leung as Caitlyn. Following the season one finale, Netflix announced a second season was in development.

Notes

References

External links
 
 

 

 
2009 video games
Esports games
Free-to-play video games
MacOS games
Multiplayer online battle arena games
Multiplayer video games
Riot Games games
Science fantasy video games
Tencent
Video games developed in the United States
Video games containing loot boxes
Windows games
BAFTA winners (video games)
Riot Games
Video games containing battle passes